Beverly Hills Cop is a film franchise of American action comedy films and an unaired television pilot based on characters created by Daniel Petrie, Jr. and Danilo Bach. The films star Eddie Murphy as Axel Foley, a street-smart Detroit cop who travels to Beverly Hills, California to investigate a crime, even though it is out of his jurisdiction. There, he meets Detective Billy Rosewood (Judge Reinhold), Sergeant John Taggart (John Ashton), and Lieutenant Andrew Bogomil (Ronny Cox). Ashton and Cox do not appear in Beverly Hills Cop III. Murphy and Reinhold are the only actors who appear in all four films. Harold Faltermeyer produced the "Axel F" theme song heard throughout the series. The first three films have been distributed by Paramount Pictures, while Netflix is set to distribute the fourth film. The films have grossed a total of $712 million at the worldwide box office.

Following a failed attempt at a television series based on the films, a fourth film is in development with Murphy and producer Jerry Bruckheimer set to return.

Background

Axel Foley

Films

Beverly Hills Cop (1984)

Axel Foley (Eddie Murphy) is introduced as a Detroit cop who, after the murder of his best friend, travels to California to investigate and track down the killer(s), whom he believes operates an art dealership as a cover in Beverly Hills. He teams up with two reluctant detectives from the Beverly Hills Police Department, Billy Rosewood (Judge Reinhold) and John Taggart (John Ashton), who were ordered to keep a watch on him, especially after seeing Foley's differing approach to police work, tactics considered unacceptable by the chief of police.

Beverly Hills Cop II (1987)

Axel returns to Beverly Hills, after finding out that Captain Andrew Bogomil (Ronny Cox) was shot. He once again teams up with Rosewood and Taggart, who, reluctantly and against incompetent and verbally abusive Police Chief Harold Lutz's (Allen Garfield) orders, assist Foley to find the person responsible for Bogomil's shooting. Axel, Rosewood and Taggart discover that the alphabet crimes, a series of felonies (robberies and Bogomil's shooting) that have been going on in the area, are masterminded by weapons kingpin Maxwell Dent (Jürgen Prochnow). With this information, the trio set out to find Dent and his lover, Karla Fry (Brigitte Nielsen).

Beverly Hills Cop III (1994)

Axel returns to Beverly Hills once again. During an assignment, his boss, Inspector Todd (Gil Hill) is killed, and certain evidence points towards an amusement park called "Wonderworld". Upon arriving in Beverly Hills, Axel looks up Rosewood, who has attained the title of DDOJSIOC (Deputy Director of Joint Special Inter Operational Command). Taggart has retired and a new detective, Jon Flint (Hector Elizondo), serves as Rosewood's new partner.

Beverly Hills Cop: Axel Foley (2023)

A fourth installment was initially announced for release in the mid-'90s, under the helm of Murphy's production company, though this never came to fruition. The project was announced once again to be in development in 2006, with Bruckheimer once again serving as producer. This changed when Lorenzo di Bonaventura stepped in as producer. After various versions of the script had undergone rewrites, Brett Ratner signed on to direct. By July 2008, Michael Brandt and Derek Haas were hired as screenwriters to rewrite the existing script. After the script was completed, it was decided that the story needed another rewrite.

By October 2011, the fourth film was shelved in favor of a television series centered around Axel's son, Aaron (Brandon T. Jackson). Murphy signed on as producer for the series, citing issues with the script as the reason that the film was not being made. In December 2013 after filming a pilot episode, and when CBS passed on a series order, Paramount revived Beverly Hills Cop IV. Ratner was once again hired to serve as director, with Murphy reprising the role of Axel. By May 2014, Josh Appelbaum and André Nemec were hired to write the screenplay. The state of Michigan approved $13.5 million in film incentives, based on an estimated $56.6 million of filmmaker spending in the state. The film, intended to be shot in and around Detroit and was estimated to provide jobs for 352 workers, was originally scheduled for a March 25, 2016, release, but was later pulled due to script concerns.

In June 2016, it was announced that Adil El Arbi and Bilall Fallah were hired to replace Ratner as co-directors. In September 2018, the filmmakers expressed their interest in having Tom Hardy or Channing Tatum cast in supporting roles. In October 2019, Murphy announced that principal photography would commence, once Coming 2 America had finished production. In November 2019, Paramount announced that they had licensed the property to be distributed by Netflix, with options for an additional sequel thereafter. By May 2020, after delays in the filmmaking business caused by the COVID-19 pandemic, Arbi and Fallah confirmed they are still attached and that a new screenwriter was working on a new script. In February 2022, the film entered pre-production and received a California state tax credit of $16,059,000 total. In April 2022, it was announced that Mark Molloy would replace Adil El Arbi and Bilall Fallah as director of the film. In the same article, Will Beall was announced to have written the screenplay. In August 2022, Jerry Bruckheimer revealed the fourth installment is set to begin filming late August-early September. The same month, Joseph Gordon-Levitt and Taylour Paige were cast. In the same month, Paul Reiser and John Ashton were confirmed to reprise their roles as Det. Jeffrey Friedman and Sgt. John Taggart, respectively. In September 2022, it was confirmed that Judge Reinhold and Bronson Pinchot would reprise their roles as Det. William "Billy" Rosewood and Serge, respectively.

Television
CBS ordered a pilot with Brandon T. Jackson starring as Axel Foley's son, Aaron. The hour-long crime drama was produced by writer Shawn Ryan (The Shield, The Chicago Code).

In January 2013, Ryan stated, "It's going to be a CBS procedural. We're going to solve a case every week, but we're going to do it with a lot of humor and a lot of fun. And I would say the stealth thing I would like to get in is, in a day and age when income inequality and class inequities dominate a lot of the country, this is going to be an opportunity to put a young working-class kid in Detroit in the middle of Beverly Hills, you can do a lot of stealth social commentary. My approach is to update it and make it feel modern and 2013. The pilot opens with a 4–5 minute sequence which I think is really harrowing and really dangerous, that would be something that you might have seen on Chicago Code or The Shield. I want it to feel grounded in that way. There'll be some opportunities for laughs after that. It's not a laughs come first show."

In February 2013, Kevin Pollak was cast as Rodney Daloof, an irritating and risk-averse in-house attorney for the Beverly Hills Police Department. David Denman was cast as Brad, an honest and likable but socially awkward detective, formerly a baseball player and a musician. Director Barry Sonnenfeld agreed to both direct the Beverly Hills Cop pilot and serve as an executive producer. In May 2013, CBS decided to pass on the Beverly Hills Cop TV series. In August 2013, Jackson gave his reason about the pass: I think we were very edgy for CBS. I think we were the edgiest as you could've went for CBS. It would have been like a Fresh Prince thing on CBS, like the edgiest you can go on network TV. But it doesn't agree to our franchise man."

In February 2015, Murphy stated that his cameo appearance in the pilot ironically doomed the show's chances: "I was gonna be in the pilot, and they thought I should be recurring. I'm not gonna do Beverly Hills Cop on TV. I remember when they tested it — they had this little knob that you turn if you like it or you don't like it. So when Axel shows up in the pilot, some people turned the knob so much, they broke it. So the network decided 'if he isn't recurring, then this isn't gonna happen'. So it didn't happen." Four years later, in 2019, Murphy reiterates this statement: The reason that didn't get picked up was because [the studio] thought that I was going to be in this show, because [the lead] was my son: "And you're going to pop in every now and then". I was like, "I ain't popping in shit". "Well, we ain't making this TV show". I was in the pilot, but they wanted me to be there every week. The pilot was really good. It tested where they have these knobs [that you] turn if you like it. And whenever I came on the screen, Axel Foley would come on the screen, they turned it so they literally broke the knobs on the thing. It was like, "Damn, they breaking knobs?"

In a January 2016 interview, Ryan blamed personality clashes with the network: "The official answer is they decided they liked other pilots better. If you look at what pilots they picked up that year, I think that's kind of incredible. I would say there were a lot of 400 lb. gorillas involved in the show and sometimes the gorillas don't always get along." He also said that he was very proud of the pilot and loved working with Murphy. After CBS passed on ordering the pilot episode to series, Paramount moved on developing a fourth film instead. By December 2022, the full episode was leaked online.

Cast and crew

Principal cast

Additional crew

Reception

Box office performance

Critical and public response

Accolades
Beverly Hills Cop
 Academy Awards
 nominated for Best Writing (Original Screenplay) – Danilo Bach and Daniel Petrie, Jr.
 British Academy Film Awards
 Nominated for Best Score – Harold Faltermeyer
 Golden Globe Awards
 Nominated for Best Motion Picture – Musical or Comedy
 Nominated for Best Actor – Motion Picture Musical or Comedy – Eddie Murphy

Beverly Hills Cop II
 Academy Awards
 Nominated for Best Original Song for "Shakedown" – Harold Faltermeyer, Keith Forsey and Bob Seger
 Golden Globe Awards
 Nominated for Best Original Song for "Shakedown" – Harold Faltermeyer, Keith Forsey, and Bob Seger
 Golden Raspberry Awards
 Winner for Worst Original Song for "I Want Your Sex" – George Michael

Beverly Hills Cop III
 Golden Raspberry Awards
 Nominated for Worst Director – John Landis
 Nominated for Worst Remake or Sequel

Music

Soundtracks

Singles
 "Axel F"
 "The Heat Is On"
 "Neutron Dance"
 "New Attitude"
 "Stir It Up"
 "Cross My Broken Heart"
 "I Want Your Sex"
 "Shakedown"
 "Luv 4 Dem Gangsta'z"
 "The Right Kinda Lover"

In other media

Novelization
1987: Robert Tine: Beverly Hills Cop II: A Novel,  Pocket; Mti edition,

Video games

In 1990, Tynesoft released a loose adaptation of the first movie in the series. The game was released for the Commodore 64, ZX Spectrum, BBC Micro, Amstrad CPC, Amiga, Atari ST, and MS-DOS.

The second title based on the franchise is a first-person shooter developed by Atomic Planet Entertainment and published by Blast! Entertainment. It was released in Europe for the PlayStation 2 in 2006. The players take control of Axel Foley over six missions that are unfolding outdoors as well as indoors. There are six implemented weapons, such as pistol, machine gun and shotgun. For WhatCulture, Padraig Cotter said the game was "poorly designed mess, with horrible stealth sections you can fail for no clear reason, appalling AI, a paltry number of levels and fiddly shooting mechanics." Zach Ames of smosh.com listed Beverly Hills Cop at #2 on his list "5 Video Games Based On Movies That Make No Sense". He criticized the fact that Foley's model didn't use Eddie Murphy's likeness in the game. Jeff Gerstmann of Giant Bomb referred to the game as "the 9/11 of video games".

See also
 The main theme music for the series titled "Axel F", which was composed by Harold Faltermeyer, was covered and remixed by Crazy Frog.
 In the NTSF:SD:SUV:: episode, titled "Wasilla Hills Cop" is a reference to the movie franchise.

References 

Action film franchises
American action comedy films
American buddy comedy films
American buddy cop films
 
Comedy film series
Fictional portrayals of the Detroit Police Department
Film series introduced in 1984
Films set in Beverly Hills, California
Paramount Pictures franchises
American film series